Isak Musliu (born 31 October 1970), is a former member of Kosovo Liberation Army (KLA or UÇK in Albanian). 

He was known as “Qerqiz” during the Yugoslav wars. After the Kosovo War, he was accused by the International Criminal Tribunal for the former Yugoslavia of a series of beatings and murders in the KLA's Lapušnik prison camp against Serbian civilians and suspected Albanians opposed to the UÇK between May and July 1998 during the Kosovo War. The most serious incident listed in the indictment is said to have occurred on July 26 that year, when the facility was abandoned in the face of a Serb Army advance. Prosecutors claimed that Haradin Bala and another guard led some 20 prisoners up into nearby mountains, where some were released and the rest were lined up and shot, allegedly on Fatmir Limaj's orders. 

On 30 November 2005, Musliu was acquitted on all charges. He was released from custody the following day. His acquittal was confirmed on appeal.

References

1970 births
Kosovo Albanians
Living people
People acquitted by the International Criminal Tribunal for the former Yugoslavia
People from Štimlje
Place of birth missing (living people)
Kosovo Liberation Army soldiers